Visa Tuominen (born 7 July 1983 in Turku, Finland) is a Finnish figure skater. He is the 2002 Finnish national silver medalist. He competed for three seasons on the Junior Grand Prix circuit.

External links
 

Finnish male single skaters
1983 births
Living people
Sportspeople from Turku